The seventh season of the television sitcom Last Man Standing premiered on September 28, 2018 on Fox, and concluded on May 10, 2019. It was the first season to air on Fox (whose partner studio of Disney's owned 20th Century Fox Television produces the show), as the series was cancelled on May 10, 2017 by ABC, and Fox picked it up for a seventh season on May 11, 2018. The season consisted of 22 episodes.

Cast

Main cast
 Tim Allen as Mike Baxter
 Nancy Travis as Vanessa Baxter
 Amanda Fuller as Kristin Beth Baxter
 Molly McCook as Amanda Elaine "Mandy" Baxter-Anderson
 Christoph Sanders as Kyle Anderson
 Jet Jurgensmeyer as Boyd Baxter
 Jordan Masterson as Ryan Vogelson
 Jonathan Adams as Chuck Larabee
 Héctor Elizondo as Edward "Ed" Alzate
 Krista Marie Yu as Jen

Recurring
 Kaitlyn Dever as Eve Baxter
 Jay Leno as Joe Leonard
 Tisha Campbell as Carol Larabee

Guest
 Robert Forster as Bud Baxter
 Susan Sullivan as Bonnie
 Bill Engvall as Reverend Paul
 Melissa Peterman as Celia Powers
 François Chau as Henry

Episodes

Production

Cancellation and renewal 
On May 11, 2017, it was announced that ABC had officially cancelled Last Man Standing. On May 11, 2018, a year after the announcement of its cancellation, Fox officially picked up the series for a 22-episode seventh season after. Coincidentally, Fox cancelled   Brooklyn Nine-Nine at the same time, but it was later picked up by NBC in a situation similar to that of Last Man Standing.

Casting 
Most previous main cast members returned for the seventh season, except that, on July 2, 2018, Molly Ephraim and Flynn Morrison announced that they would exit the series, opting not to return for this season. On August 6, 2018, Molly McCook and Jet Jurgensmeyer joined the series for recasting as Mandy and Boyd Baxter, respectively. Kaitlyn Dever would continue as Eve Baxter, but reduced to recurring status due to other commitments.

Broadcast 
The season premiered by fall of 2018–19 television season. It aired Fridays at 8:00 pm as of September 28, 2018.

Reception

Critical response
On review aggregator Rotten Tomatoes, season 7 holds an approval rating of 58% based on 12 reviews, and an average rating of 5.21/10. The website's critical consensus reads, "Last Man Standing isn't the most realistic sitcom on the dial, but its idealistic representation of opposites living in harmony offers sorely needed hope during divided times." On Metacritic, the season has a weighted average score of 58 out of 100, based on 8 critics, indicating "mixed or average reviews".

Ratings

References

2018 American television seasons
2019 American television seasons
Last Man Standing (American TV series)